Panki Dham railway station is a large railway station in Kanpur district, Uttar Pradesh, India. Panki Dham is the fourth-largest railway station in Kanpur city, for which is serves. Its code is PNKD. The station consists of 3 platforms and has many Express/Mail trains stoppage.

Overview

Panki is an important industrial suburb in Kanpur city. Duncan's Fertilizer Unit (now owned by Jaypee Group) situated here is one of the largest fertilizer-manufacturing plants in India. Panki also has Panki Hanuman Temple which is visited by thousands of people every year from all over North India. Panki Station being on Howrah–Delhi main line serves people from Kalianpur, Panki, Armapur Estate, Kakadeo, Vijay Nagar and Fazalganj and if station have an direct entrance through Kalpi Road then it may also cover area like Bhaunti, Barra Dabauli ie almost 40% of Kanpur city.
There should be a City bus stop in new entrance too.

Gallery

References

Railway stations in Kanpur
P